Chen Ming-jer (born 1954) is a Taiwanese business and management academic. He is the Leslie E. Grayson Professor of Business Administration at University of Virginia Darden School of Business.

Early life and education 
Chen was born and raised in rural Taitung. Due to his upbringing, Chen frequently considered himself an outsider. He pursued an early interest in international affairs by reading the newspaper. Aged 17, Chen left Taitung for college. He earned a bachelor of science at National Chung Hsing University. He obtained a master of education from National Taiwan Normal University. He completed a master of business administration and doctor of philosophy at University of Maryland, College Park.

Career 
Chen began his teaching career at Columbia University and was a faculty member at Wharton School of the University of Pennsylvania starting in 1997. He is the Leslie E. Grayson Professor of Business Administration at University of Virginia Darden School of Business.

Personal life 
Chen lives in Charlottesville, Virginia with his wife and two sons.

Awards and honors 
Chen is a fellow of the Academy of Management and served as the group's 68th president in 2013. He is a fellow of the Strategic Management Society.

Works

Books 

 Inside Chinese Business: A Guide for Managers Worldwide (2001)
 Competitive Dynamics: A Research Odyssey (2009)

References 

Living people
Business theorists
21st-century Taiwanese educators
Taiwanese male writers
Taiwanese academics
20th-century Taiwanese educators
Wharton School of the University of Pennsylvania faculty
University of Virginia faculty
National Chung Hsing University alumni
National Taiwan Normal University alumni
University of Maryland, College Park alumni
Taiwanese emigrants to the United States
Expatriate academics in the United States
1954 births
20th-century Taiwanese writers
21st-century Taiwanese writers
Writers from Charlottesville, Virginia
People from Taitung County
Columbia University faculty